Sander Gillé and Joran Vliegen defeated Sriram Balaji and Jeevan Nedunchezhiyan in the final, 6–4, 6–4 to win the doubles tennis title at the 2023 Maharashtra Open. It was their sixth ATP Tour title as a team.

Rohan Bopanna and Ramkumar Ramanathan were the defending champions, but chose not to compete together. Bopanna partnered Botic van de Zandschulp, but lost in the first round to Ramanathan and Miguel Ángel Reyes-Varela. Ramanathan and Reyes-Varela lost in the quarterfinals to Rajeev Ram and Joe Salisbury.

Seeds

Draw

Draw

References

External links
Main draw

2023 ATP Tour
2023 Tata Open Maharashtra
2023 Tata Open Maharashtra – 2